Robert Thalmann (1 February 1949 – 23 May 2017) was a Swiss cyclist. He competed in the individual road race event at the 1976 Summer Olympics.

References

External links
 

1949 births
2017 deaths
Swiss male cyclists
Olympic cyclists of Switzerland
Cyclists at the 1976 Summer Olympics